Nou Hach (26 June 1916  1975) was a Cambodian author, perhaps best known for his novel, Phka Sropoun. He was born in Battambang, and died during the Khmer Rouge regime.

Early life and education 
Hach was born to a farming family in Kampong Preah Commune, Sangkae District, Battambang Province, Cambodia. He was the first child of his family. He studied at Wat Kampong Preah Primary School and could read sastra sloek roet, a kind of Khmer book made from leaves, very fluently. In 1932, he passed the entrance exam at Preah Sisovath High School in Phnom Penh. He was very studious and hardworking, and graduated successfully.

Career 
After graduation, he work as a jude in Siem Reap. In 1947, he became a publisher for Kampuchea Newspaper in the Ministry of information. Then he became the assistant of the prime minister Yutavong (យុត្តិវង្ស) in 1948. After that, he returned to the Ministry of Information and worked as the head of the department.

In 1952, he worked for the Ministry of Foreign Affairs, as Director in Directorate of Political Affairs (Director en Direction des Affaires Politiques). As Director, he was sent to have commission in Thailand, Yugoslavia and so on. Due to his good work, he was  appointed as the Cambodian representative to Vietnam and Indonesia, as well as a special representative at United Nations.

In 1952, King Norodom Sihanouk  appointed him as the secretary of Ministry of Public Works and Communication by Royal Decree 252.

On January 17, 1958, he became a member of the Khmer Writer Association, created by Rim Kin in 1954, according to Neak Nipun Khmer Magazine Year 2, Number 3, February 1996 Page 3.

Personal life 
Nou Hach married Tan Rem and had 8 children. Some of his children currently live in the United States and Australia. He was killed by the Khmer Rouge in 1975.

Literary career and selected works 
His best-known novel is Phka Sropoun. He also wrote numerous poems in French. In addition, he contributed to many magazines, such as Reatrey Thngai Sao Magazine, Neary Magazine, and Roum Mitt Magazine.

His other works include:

References 

Cambodian male writers
20th-century Cambodian writers
1916 births
1975 deaths